Rait may refer to the following people
Given name
Rait Ärm (born 2000), Estonian road cyclist
Rait Käbin (born 1981), Estonian basketball coach and former player
Rait Keerles (born 1980), Estonian basketball player
Rait Maruste (born 1953), Estonian judge, legal scholar and politician
Rait-Riivo Laane (born 1993), Estonian, basketball player 
Rait Rikberg (born 1982), Estonian volleyball player

Middle name
Rowan Rait Kerr (1891–1961), Irish-born cricketer and administrator

Surname
Alan Rait (1908–1965), Australian rules football player 
James Rait (1689–1777), Scottish clergyman 
John de Rait, 14th-century Scottish cleric
Mohamed Billal Rait (born 1986), Algerian football player
Rita Rait-Kovaleva (1898–1989), Soviet literary translator and writer
Robert Rait (1874–1936), Scottish historian

See also
 Raitt

Estonian masculine given names